Çerikli is a town in Delice district of Kırıkkale Province, Turkey. The population of Çerikli was 2292 as of 2011. According to town page the history of the settlement goes back to ancient ages. 11th-century Turkmen tribes were settled in Çerikli. After Seljuks of Turkey and Eretna domination, it was incorporated into Ottoman realm. In 1967 Çerikli was declared a seat of township. The main economic sector is agriculture. But animal breeding and light industry also play a role in town economy.

References 

Populated places in Kırıkkale Province
Towns in Turkey
Delice District